The montane thick-toed gecko (Pachydactylus montanus) is a species of lizard in the family Gekkonidae. It is found in Namibia and South Africa.

References

Pachydactylus
Geckos of Africa
Reptiles of Namibia
Reptiles of South Africa
Reptiles described in 1914
Taxa named by John Hewitt (herpetologist)
Taxa named by Paul Ayshford Methuen